Arthur George Holt (8 April 1911 – 28 July 1994) was a Hampshire first-class cricketer in the 1930s and 1940s, who also played professional football for Southampton. After retirement from playing both sports, he became a coach with Hampshire and established a successful sports shop.

Football career

Holt was born in Southampton and represented Southampton Schoolboys, before turning out for Bitterne Congregational in the Church League. Moving to Totton in the Hampshire League he came to the notice of Southampton, whom he joined in September 1931 as an amateur, before signing as a professional in October 1932.

He made his first-team debut away to Manchester United on 7 January 1933 as centre-forward in place of Ted Drake who was suffering from influenza. Despite scoring twice in five games, he lost his place to Drake and only made three more appearances in the 1932–33 season. In the following season he established his place in the side, playing as an inside-forward alongside Drake, Dick Neal, Tommy Brewis and Fred Tully. It soon became obvious to manager George Kay that in Holt and Drake "Saints possessed two extremely promising young forwards".

He was "a punchy, enterprising player" and was "reputed to be one of the hardest kickers of a dead ball in the Football League". Over the next few seasons he remained a stalwart in the forward line as other players came and went as Saints struggled both on the pitch and financially.

His best season was 1935–36 when, now supporting Vic Watson, he scored 13 goals (to Watson's 14). The 7–2 home win over Nottingham Forest on 15 February 1936 was the first time that two Saints players had scored hat-tricks in the same match. Watson and Holt were the hat-trick heroes, with Dick Neal popping in the seventh in Saints first seven-goal haul in a Division Two match.

He continued to appear for the Saints in the early years of World War II, but joined the police and turned out for Cunliffe-Owen Aircraft in the local wartime league. Whilst playing for Cunliffe-Owen, he "discovered" Len Wilkins and recommended him to the Saints. Wilkins became the mainstay of the Saints' defence until retiring in 1958.

In his Saints career, Holt played a total of 214 games, scoring 47 goals.

Cricket career

Playing career
Holt had won Hampshire County honours at youth level before embarking on his football career, and made his first team debut against Somerset at Taunton on 8 June 1935. He went on to make seven appearances for Hampshire in the 1935 County Championship. The following season, he made only three appearances, but in 1937 he made sixteen appearances. In the County Championship match against Surrey at The Oval in May, he made 78 in the first innings, partnering Johnny Arnold (who had also been a Southampton footballer) in a stand of 122 for the third wicket. In the second innings Holt scored 64, partnering Arthur Pothecary in a stand of 125 for the second wicket, as Hampshire won the match by 71 runs. Holt finished the season on a total of 586 runs at an average of 23.44.

His first game in the following season was at Aylestone Road, Leicester in which he scored his first century in county cricket, making 116 and partnering Neil McCorkell in an opening stand of 101. In the second innings he added a further 41 runs, but the match ended in a draw.

His only other first-class century came at Edgbaston in June 1939, where he scored 115 against Warwickshire, putting on 137 for the fourth wicket (with Johnny Arnold). In this match he also claimed his only wicket as the match again ended in a draw.

He continued to appear for Hampshire after World War II, making his highest season's total of 850 runs in 1946 at an average of 25.00.

His final match for Hampshire came at the Manor Sports Ground, Worthing against Sussex in July 1948. In his first-class career, he played 79 matches for Hampshire, scoring 2853 runs at an average of 22.46.

Coaching career
After retiring from playing, he joined Hampshire's coaching staff at the County Ground, Southampton, where he coached the Colts and is credited with discovering several fine players.

In 1953, he helped John Arlott persuade Henry Horton to take up county cricket as his football career at Southampton was winding down.

John Arlott describes Holt in his memoirs:
"Go to the County Ground on any day in the cricket season – or, for that matter, on a good many days outside it – and somewhere between the indoor school and the pavilion you are likely to meet a comfortable, well-fed-looking man going in one direction when he obviously wants to go in several. He has a rosy face, a quizzical look in his blue eyes and one eyebrow goes up as he asks you wistfully, out of the side of his mouth, "ave you seen so-and-so?" This is 'The Coach'. Arthur Holt finds that title convenient: it saves him the embarrassment of telling ground staff boys that they must call him Mister Holt and not Arthur."

Business interests
In 1946, Holt established Holt & Haskell Limited, a sports retailers in Shirley, Southampton. The business is still operating today, specialising in the sale of cricket clothing and equipment, and is one of the UK's leading cricket specialists.

The Arthur Holt Pavilion
In 2004, the second XI pavilion on the Nursery ground at Hampshire's new Rose Bowl stadium was officially named The Arthur Holt Pavilion in memory of a great servant to the club.

References

External links
Cricket career at cricketarchive.com
cricinfo profile
Holt & Haskell Limited website

1911 births
1994 deaths
Cricketers from Southampton
English footballers
Footballers from Southampton
A.F.C. Totton players
Southampton F.C. players
English cricketers
Hampshire cricketers
Association football forwards